The second cabinet of Nicolae Crețulescu was the government of Romania from 14 June 1865 to 11 February 1866.

Ministers
The ministers of the cabinet were as follows:

President of the Council of Ministers:
Nicolae Crețulescu (14 June 1865 - 11 February 1866)
Minister of the Interior, Agriculture, and Public Works: 
Gen. Ioan Em. Florescu (14 June 1865 - 30 January 1866)
Nicolae Crețulescu (30 January - 11 February 1866)
Minister of Foreign Affairs: 
Nicolae Rosetti-Bălănescu (14 June - 2 October 1865)
Grigore Bengescu (2 - 3 October 1865)
(interim) Gen. Savel Manu (3 - 17 October 1865)
Alexandru Papadopol Calimah (17 October 1865 - 11 February 1866)
Minister of Finance:
Nicolae Crețulescu (14 June 1865 - 30 January 1866)
Ioan Oteteleșeanu (30 January - 11 February 1866)
Minister of Justice and Religious Affairs:
(interim) Dimitrie Cariagdi (14 - 27 June 1865)
Dimitrie Cariagdi (27 June 1865 - 11 February 1866)
Minister of War:
Gen. Savel Manu (14 June 1865 - 30 January 1866)
Col. Alexandru Solomon (30 January - 11 February 1866)
Minister of Control:
(interim) Nicolae Rosetti-Bălănescu (14 - 17 June 1865)
(interim) Gen. Savel Manu (17 June -23 August 1865)

References

Cabinets of Romania
Cabinets established in 1865
Cabinets disestablished in 1866
1865 establishments in Romania
1866 disestablishments in Romania